Aphanius mesopotamicus is a species of fish in the family Cyprinodontidae. It is found in the Euphrates basin of Iraq and Iran.

References 
 
 

mesopotamicus
Fish described in 2009
Fish of Iran
Fauna of Iraq